Calveriosoma gracile is a species of sea urchin in the order Echinothurioida.

Description 
It has a somewhat flattened globose shape resembling a cushion. It is one of a group of echinoderms that instead of having a rigid test consisting of fused calcareous plates, has a flexible leathery skin with loose, wedge-shaped plates embedded in it. This makes the boundaries between the plates easy to observe. Other distinguishing characteristics include hollow spines tipped with hoof-like structures and simple mouthparts. Echinoderms in this order were known only as fossils having been found in deposits such as the chalk beds of southern England dating back to the Cretaceous era. It was only in the Challenger expedition of the 1870s that living members of the group were found, when deep ocean floors were dredged to investigate the organisms living at these great depths.

Distribution and habitat 
It is known to occur in the Sea of Japan and near the Philippines and New Zealand on soft sediments.

Biology 
Calveriosoma gracile is a scavenger and feeds on algal material and other organic detritus that sinks to the sea floor. Little is known of its behaviour and life cycle but it is likely to have yolky, lecithotrophic eggs that float towards the surface before falling back to the seabed as is the case in its more studied relative, Phormosoma placenta.

References 

Echinothuriidae
Animals described in 1881